The Altman was an early automobile produced in 1901 in Cleveland, Ohio, by Henry J. Altman.  Altman built the car at his home at 11 Pier Street, with his wife helping assemble the radiator in the kitchen. The car featured a two-cylinder engine suspended midship under the seat. In 1909 Altman converted the tonneau body to a roadster before selling the car to a local paperhanger for $200. Whether Altman built more cars is unknown.

References

Veteran vehicles
Cars introduced in 1901
Motor vehicle manufacturers based in Ohio
Defunct companies based in Cleveland
Vehicle manufacturing companies established in 1901
1901 establishments in Ohio
Defunct motor vehicle manufacturers of the United States
1900s cars
History of Cleveland